Ahmed Naji (born 15 September 1985) (Arabic: أحمد ناجي) is an Egyptian journalist and literary novelist. He was born in Mansoura. He has written numerous journalistic and critical articles and published three books: Rogers (2007), Seven Lessons Learned from Ahmed Makky (2009), and The Use of Life (2014). The latter book resulted in his being jailed in Egypt in 2016 for "violating public modesty," due to its sexual content and drug references, marking the first time in modern Egypt that an author has been jailed for a work of literature. The book since been translated by Ben Koerber. Naji was also a regular contributor to Al-Akhbar al-Adab and Al-Masry Al-Youm, among other publications.

He served almost 300 days in jail before being released, and later was granted the PEN/Barbey Freedom to Write Award from PEN America. He moved to Washington D.C. with his wife Yasmin Hosam El Din. He is currently serving his fellowship at Black Mountain Institute in Las Vegas, Nevada, with his wife and their infant daughter.

Early life
He was born on September 15, 1985 in Mansoura, Egypt. Growing up, Naji had always been fascinated with mainly comics or books for kids and teenagers. He found a passion for writing at the young age of 10 but knew how dangerous the censorship laws could be while living in Egypt. He worked as a journalist in Mansoura and wrote his first book Rogers in 2007. He first ran into legal trouble in 2015, when a chapter of The Use of Life was published in the state-run literary magazine Akhbar al-Adab.

Career
In his career, Naji has published a total of three books: Rogers (2007), Seven Lessons Learned from Ahmed Makky (2009) and The Use of Life (2014). Journalistically he has published dozens of opinion articles and reports with various print and online publications and blogs. He worked as a journalist for the literary magazine Akhbar Al-Adab and contributed to numerous magazines and websites including Al-Masry al-Youm and Al-Modon. 

His work is considered controversial, particularly for Egyptian social and political contexts, and is seen by some as pushing against conservative cultural boundaries.

In 2015, Naji ran into legal trouble after a chapter of his novel, The Use of Life, was published in the literary magazine Akhbar Al-Adab. In 2016, he was fined through a higher court and imprisoned on the base accusation that his novel The Use of Life violated public modesty by making sexual references along with references to intoxicants, which are highly taboo in Egypt. After spending 300 days in jail, he was released on December 22, 2016. He is known to be the first Egyptian writer imprisoned on accounts of immorality. In May 2016, PEN recognized him for his adversity by giving him the Pen/Barbey Freedom to Write Award. 

Since being convicted, his case became known around the world and has increased his book sales. The rise in knowledge of his trial also increased support for his freedom, causing many to push for his release. After years of being in and out of court, Naji's jail time was replaced by a fine and his travel ban was lifted in July 2018. He was finally able to leave Cairo in 2019. Since then, Naji has traveled to America to reunite with his wife after a year kept apart. Since leaving Egypt, Naji has told reporters that he now feels as if he can think freely and reexamine what has happened to him.

Although Naji has expressed feelings of relative freedom in America, there are still many unanswered questions to him such as if he will stay in America, will he write for American or Egyptian audiences, how will he continue as an exiled writer and many more. While he is optimistic about his new life in America, he knows that these questions will need to be answered at some point. While the future is uncertain for Naji and his family, they are remaining positive, with his wife saying “there’s nothing more thrilling for me than new beginnings”.

Political Views
Naji has been known for being very critical of trends in Egyptian pop culture since his blogs in the early 2000s. He has been described as “iconoclastic.”  While Naji does tend to have writing that is considered to be controversial in Egypt, his writings oftentimes don't mention politics, but instead provoke protests and revolutions. For example, in his book Using Life Naji rarely mentions the politics in Egypt, but instead talks of how the revolution in 2011 didn't cause much political or social change.

Legacy
Naji received most of his praise once his trial was known around the world. 

In May 2016, PEN America granted Naji with the PEN/Barbey Freedom to Write Award at their annual Literary Gala in New York. Just five months later, PEN America sent a letter to President Abdel Fattah al-Sisi containing signatures from over 120 writers demanding Naji to be released from prison immediately. Between these two events, an International day of Reading for Ahmed Naji was started in May to further push the release of Naji. Although Naji was not appreciated by the Egyptian Government, he had the support of many writers both near and far throughout his trial against the government.

References

Egyptian novelists
1985 births
Living people
People from Mansoura, Egypt